Thectophila is a genus of moths in the family Cosmopterigidae, although some sources place it in the family Blastodacnidae. The genus contains only one species, Thectophila acmotypa. This species is endemic to New Zealand. It is classified as "Data Deficient" by the Department of Conservation.

Taxonomy
This species was originally described by Edward Meyrick in 1927 using a female specimen collected by George Hudson at Arthur's Pass at approximately 1200 m. in February. Hudson discussed and illustrated the species under that name in his 1928 publication The Butterflies and Moths of New Zealand. The holotype specimen is held at the Natural History Museum, London.

Description 
Meyrick described the species as follows:

Distribution 
This species is endemic to New Zealand. It is only known from one locality, Arthur's Pass.

Biology and behaviour 
Very little is known of the biology of this species. The adult male is on the wing in February.

Habitat and host species 
This species prefers habitat consisting of rough herbage in mountainous terrain. The habitat of the species is protected as it falls within the Arthur's Pass National Park. The host species of this moths larvae is unknown.

Conservation status 
This species has been classified as having the "Data Deficient" conservation status under the New Zealand Threat Classification System.

References

External links

Image of holotype specimen

Cosmopterigidae
Moths of New Zealand
Endemic fauna of New Zealand
Moths described in 1927
Taxa named by Edward Meyrick
Endemic moths of New Zealand